Aoife Colvill (born 26 December 2000) is an Irish Australian football forward, who plays for Glasgow City of the Scottish Women's Premier League and for the Republic of Ireland women's national football team.

Club career 
During the 2018 season, playing for Canberra United Academy, she finished as the highest scorer in the Capital Football's Premier League, scoring 42 goals in 19 games. That year, she would also make a handful of appearances for Canberra United in the W-League.

In 2020, she left Australia to move to Scotland, signing a two-year contract with Glasgow City in SWPL after a three-month trial. She was part of the Glasgow squad that became the first Scottish club in history to qualify for the UEFA Women's Champions League quarter-finals in 2020. In April 2022 Colville underwent surgery for an anterior cruciate ligament injury.

International career 
Colvill represented the junior Australian national team during the 2019 AFC Under-19 Women's Championship qualifiers.

In April 2021 Colvill was one of four Irish-eligible players to be invited to a senior Republic of Ireland national team training camp. In the event she suffered an injury and was unable to attend. Ireland coach Vera Pauw called up Colvill again in June 2021 for two friendlies against Iceland. She won her first senior cap in the first game, starting Ireland's 3–2 defeat at Laugardalsvöllur.

References

External links
 

Living people
2000 births
Australian women's soccer players
Women's association football forwards
Glasgow City F.C. players
Canberra United FC players
Sportspeople from Cairns
Soccer players from Queensland
Australian expatriate women's soccer players
Australian expatriate sportspeople in Scotland
Expatriate women's footballers in Scotland
Australian people of Irish descent
Republic of Ireland women's association footballers
Republic of Ireland women's international footballers
Scottish Women's Premier League players
A-League Women players